Fyodor Kuzmich Shubin II (1783 – 1864?) was a military intelligence officer, explorer, and Colonel in the Imperial Russian Army during Napoleonic Wars.

References 

1783 births
Military personnel of the Napoleonic Wars from the Russian Empire
Recipients of the Order of St. Anna, 2nd class
Recipients of the Order of St. Anna, 4th class
Recipients of the Order of St. Vladimir, 4th class
Year of death missing